Levi Jackson (August 22, 1926 – December 7, 2000) was the first African-American football captain at Yale University and the first African-American executive at Ford Motor Company. He was a member of the Yale Class of 1950, and captained the 1949 football team, the election taken soon after the 1948 season. Like Albie Booth before him, Jackson was a football standout at Hillhouse High School in New Haven, Connecticut and Yale. Jackson was born in Branford, Connecticut. Jackson's father was a master steward and chef at Yale's Pierson College. Jackson attended Yale on the G.I. Bill. He attained the rank of sergeant in the U.S. Army Ordnance Corps.

After playing football on the Camp Lee team in Virginia for the U.S. Army, he turned down an offer to play for the New York Giants.  That would have made him the first African-American to play in the modern National Football League. Yale coach Howie Odell welcomed Jackson, the team achieving a 7–1–1 record, an Associated Press poll finish at 12, and a victory over Harvard. Jackson's squads were 3–1 versus Harvard.

Jackson's election to the captaincy was unprecedented, given he was the first African-American to play football for Yale, but no surprise within the Yale community. "The voting took only ten minutes. There was no one else. It had to be Levi," a Yale player recounted. Jackson had lettered also for the varsity basketball team Jackson is understood to be the first African-American tapped for a Yale secret or senior society. He was a member of the Berzelius Society (he was the first African-American student to join this society), the Aurelian Honor Society and of Alpha Phi Alpha fraternity. Jackson was a long time member of the Detroit YMCA Businessmen's Club where he spent many hours holding court at the "main table."

After graduating from Yale, Jackson went to work for the Ford Motor Co. in 1950. By 1962 he was an executive, the first African-American to reach that level at Ford; he was a Vice President when he retired in 1983. Alongside his responsibilities while holding positions in labor relations, he was instrumental in setting up Ford's Minority Dealer Training Program  and helped see that Ford hired 10,000 workers from within the city of Detroit, where he chose to live. He was involved in his community, working with the New Detroit Committee after the 1967 Detroit riot, and served on the National Selective Service Appeal Board in 1969, at the height of the Vietnam war.

References

1926 births
2000 deaths
Ford executives
Players of American football from New Haven, Connecticut
Yale Bulldogs football players
Yale Bulldogs men's basketball players
People from Branford, Connecticut
American men's basketball players
United States Army personnel of World War II
United States Army non-commissioned officers